Dekeyseria niveata is a species of armored catfish endemic to Venezuela where it is found in the upper Orinoco River basin.  This species grows to a length of  SL.

References 
 

Ancistrini
Fish described in 1929
Fish of Venezuela
Endemic fauna of Venezuela